Childrenite is a rare hydrated phosphate mineral with elements iron, manganese, aluminium, phosphorus, oxygen and hydrogen. Its specific gravity is 3.2 and it has a Mohs hardness of 4.5 to 5. It is usually translucent and non-fluorescent, with imperfect cleavage. It has a vitreous lustre with a white streak, and is brown or yellow in color. It has a conchoidal, uneven fracture, and an orthorhombic crystal system.

History and formation 
Childrenite was discovered in 1823 by John George Children (1777–1852), who was a prominent English chemist and mineralogist. This secondary mineral was first found in the George and Charlotte Mine near Tavistock in Devon. Its formation is probably from the alteration of granitic phosphates like  lithiophilite and triphylite. Childrenite is also found in some ore veins.

Relationship to other species 
Childrenite forms a solid solution series with eosphorite. The chemical composition of eosphorite only differs by being rich in manganese and not in iron. The structures are the same, and differences in properties can be traced to the iron/manganese percentage. Of the two, childrenite is denser. Furthermore, eosphorite is normally pink in color, which can be attributed to manganese.

References 

 Mineral Galleries
 Athena Minerals
 University of Delaware

Manganese(II) minerals
Iron(II) minerals
Aluminium minerals
Phosphate minerals
Orthorhombic minerals
Minerals in space group 41